Jennifer Jones (1919–2009) was an American actress.

Jennifer Jones may also refer to:
Gemma Jones (born 1942), English actress whose birth name is Jennifer Jones
Jennifer Jones (Rockette) (born 1967), American dancer who was the first African American Rockette
Jennifer Jones (curler) (born 1974), Canadian sports personality; competitor in the sport of curling
Jennifer Jones, murderer
Jennifer E. Jones, president of Rotary International for the 2022–2023 year
Jennifer Clare Jones, American radiation oncologist and biologist
Jenifer Jones, American politician in New Mexico

See also
Jenny Jones (disambiguation)
Jones (surname)